Kimberly Cheatle is an American security official who has served as director of the United States Secret Service since September 2022. She previously held multiple roles in the United States Secret Service over 25 years.

Education 
Cheatle earned a Bachelor of Arts degree in sociology from Eastern Illinois University in 1992.

Career 
Cheatle joined the United States Secret Service in 1995. In 2017 and 2018, she served as deputy assistant director. She also served as special-agent-in-charge in the Grand Rapids, Michigan, office. She became the first woman to serve as assistant director of Protective Operations, a department tasked with protection of the president and dignitaries, and managed a budget of over $133.5 million. During her tenure, Cheatle was assigned to the Vice Presidential Protective Division during the Obama administration.

From 2019 to 2022, Cheatle served as senior director of global security at PepsiCo, where she was responsible for directing and implementing security protocols for the company's facilities in North America. Her role involves developing risk management assessment and risk mitigation.

In 2021, President Joe Biden awarded Cheatle a Presidential Rank Award for exceptional performance.

In August 2022, President Biden announced the appointment of Cheatle to be director of the United States Secret Service, and she assumed office on September 17, 2022. Cheatle took over the Secret Service following "a turbulent couple months in which the agency best known for protecting presidents has faced controversies related to the Jan. 6, 2021, attack on the U.S. Capitol."

References 

Living people
Eastern Illinois University alumni
United States Secret Service agents
Year of birth missing (living people)
Directors of the United States Secret Service
Biden administration personnel